Pelikan is a German manufacturer of fine writing instruments.

Pelikan or Pelikán may also refer to:

 Operation Pelikan, a German plan for crippling the Panama Canal during World War II
 Pelikan Island, Palmer Archipelago, Antarctica
 Pelikan Rock, Sint Maarten, Dutch Caribbean
 Pelikan, Greater Poland Voivodeship, Poland
 MV Pelikan, a refrigerated cargo ship in service from 1935–59
 Pelikan AG, a producer of paper, office supplies and stationery articles in Europe
 Politechnika Warszawska PW-4 Pelikan, a motor-glider
 Pelikan (organization), a group in Turkey
 Pelikan tail, an experimental tail design for fighter jets
 Pelikan Łowicz, a Polish football club based in Łowicz
 FK Pelikán Děčín, a Czech football club based in Děčín
 Pelikán má alibi, a 1940 Czechoslovak criminal comedy film
 TAI Pelikan, a radio-controlled reconnaissance, surveillance and target acquisition drone
 Uetz Pelikan, a Swiss four-seat cabin monoplane designed for amateur construction by Walter Uetz

People with the surname
 Boris Aleksandrovich Pelikan (1861–1931), Mayor of Odessa, Ukraine
 Emilie Mediz-Pelikan (1861–1908), Austrian landscape painter
 Franz Pelikan (1925–1994), Austrian football goalkeeper
 János Pelikán, Hungarian cyclist
 Jaroslav Pelikan (1923–2006), scholar and author in Christian history and medieval intellectual history
 Jiří Pelikán (disambiguation)
 Jiří Pelikán (chess player) (1906–1984), Czech–Argentine chess master
 Jiří Pelikán (politician) (1923–1999), Czechoslovakian journalist and politician
 Konrad Pellikan (1478–1556), German teacher and author
 Lisa Pelikan (born 1964), French actress
 Robert Pelikán (born 1979), Czech lawyer
 Wilhelm Pelikan (1893–1981) chemist, anthroposophist, pharmacist, gardener and anthroposophical medicine practitioner

See also
 Pelican (disambiguation)